Hugo & Luigi were an American record producing team, made up of songwriters and producers Hugo Peretti and Luigi Creatore, who shared an office in New York's Brill Building. Besides their working relationship, they were cousins.

Background
First coming to attention with singles released on Mercury Records in the mid-1950s, they went on to produce Perry Como, Sam Cooke and several other RCA Victor artists, including the hit records "Twistin' the Night Away", "Another Saturday Night", "The Lion Sleeps Tonight" by the Tokens, "Shout", a classic by the Isley Brothers, and "I Will Follow Him" by Little Peggy March. They co-wrote Elvis Presley's hit "Can't Help Falling in Love", with George David Weiss. They also produced albums by Della Reese including The Classic Della, a collection of pop songs based on classical themes  and Waltz With Me, Della, a collection of popular songs in 3/4 time. Their track, "La Plume de Ma Tante" (written by Al Hoffman and Dick Manning), reached #29 in the UK Singles Chart in July 1959.

Hugo & Luigi were also onetime co-owners of Roulette Records. Songs composed by the duo were often credited to "Mark Markwell", and records they produced carried their distinct logo. While at Roulette Hugo and Luigi did a series of Beautiful Music recordings of "Cascading Voices" and later "Cascading Strings."

After founding Avco Records and producing artists such as the Stylistics in the 1970s, Hugo & Luigi launched a new label, H&L Records, which they ran until they retired, at the end of the decade. Peretti (born December 6, 1916) died on May 1, 1986. Creatore (born December 21, 1921) died on December 13, 2015.

References

External links
The Hugo & Luigi Sessions

Record production duos
Grammy Award winners
RCA Victor artists
Apex Records artists
American songwriting teams
American musical duos